The Faculty of Science, Kasetsart University is the school of science of Kasetsart University in Bangkok, Thailand. The Faculty offers undergraduate, master's, and doctoral programs. Faculty of Science, Kasetsart University was ranked as top 500 in the world for Biological Sciences, Chemistry, and Computer Science & Information Systems by QS World University Rankings by Subject. It has consistently been regarded as one of the top science schools in Thailand, often recognized for faculty research, academic teaching, and admission selectivity. Notable members of the faculty include celebrated scientists Princess Chulabhorn, a Thai princess who was awarded the UNESCO Albert Einstein medal.

History 

Kasetsart University recognizes that basic science is an important foundation for university level education for all faculties. Therefore, In 1966 Kasetsart University established the Faculty of Science and Arts. Then, The Faculty's name was changed its name to the Faculty of Science on June 17, 1981.

Academics 

The Faculty comprises 13 departments: Mathematics, Chemistry, Biochemistry, Botany, Genetics, Microbiology, Zoology, Applied Radiation and Isotope, Physics, Materials Science, Earth Science, Computer Science, and Statistics.  It is regarded among academia as a leader among science schools in Thailand for research in the areas of Biological Sciences, Physical Sciences, Data Sciences, among others.

Degrees Offered 

Undergraduate programs
 B.S. (Mathematics)
 B.S. (Chemistry)
 B.S. (Industrial Chemistry)
 B.S. (Integrated Chemistry) (International Program)
 B.S. (Biology)
 B.S. (Biochemistry)
 B.S. (Bioscience and Technology) (International Program)
 B.S. (Botany)
 B.S. (Genetics)
 B.S. (Microbiology)
 B.S. (Zoology)
 B.S. (Radiation Bioscience)
 B.S. (Physics)
 B.S. (Polymer Science and Technology) (International program)
 B.S. (Earth Sciences)
 B.S. (Computer Science)
 B.S. (Statistics)
Postgraduate programs
 M.S. (Mathematics)
 M.S. (Chemistry)
 M.S. (Biology)
 M.S. (Biochemistry)
 M.S. (Biomedical Data Science)
 M.S. (Botany)
 M.S. (Genetics)
 M.S. (Microbiology)
 M.S. (Zoology)
 M.S. (Life Science) (International Program)
 M.S. (Applied Radiation and Isotopes)
 M.S. (Physics)
 M.S. (Metrology)
 M.S. (Nanomaterials Science)
 M.S. (Earth Science and Technology)
 M.S. (Computer Science)
 M.S. (Statistics)
 Ph.D. (Chemistry)
 Ph.D. (Biochemistry)
 Ph.D. (Bioscience) (International Program)
 Ph.D. (Botany)
 Ph.D. (Genetics)
 Ph.D. (Microbiology)
 Ph.D. (Zoology)
 Ph.D. (Physics)
 Ph.D. (Nanomaterials Science)
 Ph.D. (Earth Science and Technology)
 Ph.D. (Computer Science)
 Ph.D. (Statistics)

Undergraduate degree program 

Undergraduate students complete their degree at the Faculty of Science, Kasetsart University in four years.  During the first two years of instruction, students enroll in basic sciences, mathematics, English, and foundational disciplinary courses.

The Faculty of Science, Kasetsart University has provided undergraduate students with the ability to participate in international exchange programs along the internationalization in education. The Faculty of Science has signed student exchange agreements with the universities in the United States, Europe, and the Asia-Pacific region.

Academic postgraduate program 

The academic postgraduate program at the Faculty of Science, Kasetsart University is designed for students who wish to pursue masters or doctorate degrees and intend to become scholars who can conduct high-quality scientific research in mainstream research areas relating to Biological Sciences, Physical Sciences, and Data Sciences.

In addition, Faculty of Science, Kasetsart University has extensive collaboration and exchange programs with leading international institutions such as Yale University (USA), University of California (USA), University of Bristol (UK), University  of Bath (UK), Kyoto University (Japan), Waseda University (Japan), Chimie ParisTech, PSL University (France), Stockholm University, (Sweden) etc.

Affiliated Research Centers 

Faculty of Science, Kasetsart University researches actively in its disciplines, but is regarded widely as a leader among science schools in Thailand for research in the areas of Chemistry, Biological Sciences, and Computer Science & Information Systems. Facilities that research under the Faculty of Science, Kasetsart University include:

 Special Research Unit in Number Theory, Classical Analysis and Applications
 Laboratory for Computational and Applied Chemistry, LCAC
 Analytical Method Development in Trace Analysis
 Cheminformatics Research Unit
 Natural Products and Organic Synthesis, NPOS
 Innovative Research on Drug Discovery and Molecular Design
 Special Research Unit for Protein Engineering and Protein Bioinformatics, UPEB
 Animal Systematics and Ecology Speciality Research Unit, ASESRU
 Biopesticides Toxicology Speciality Research Unit, BTSRU
 Radioecology Research Unit
 Microalgal Molecular Genetics and Functional Genomics Special Research Unit, MMGFG-SRU
 Special Research Unit in Advanced Magnetic Resonance
 Biochemical Research Unit for Utilization Assessment, BCUFUA
 Applied Geo-Exploration Research Unit, Geo-X
 The Gem and Mineral Sciences Special Research Unit
 Environmental Geotechnology and Natural Disasters Special Research Unit
 Soil and Water laboratory
 Evolutionary Genetics and Computational Biology Research Unit, EGCB

Organisation and administration

Deans 
The Deans is the head of Faculty of Science, Kasetsart University include:

Rankings and reputation 

According to the QS World University Rankings by Subject, the Faculty of Science, Kasetsart University also ranks as top 500 in the world for Life Sciences & Medicine (Biological Sciences), Natural Sciences (Chemistry), and Engineering & Technology (Computer Science & Information Systems).

 QS World University Rankings by Subject 2021
 Life Sciences & Medicine - Biological Sciences was ranked 451-500 th in the world
 Natural Sciences - Chemistry was ranked 451-500 th in the world

 QS World University Rankings by Subject 2020
 Natural Sciences - Chemistry was ranked 401-450 th in the world
 Life Sciences & Medicine - Biological Sciences was ranked 451-500 th in the world

 QS World University Rankings by Subject 2019 
 Natural Sciences - Chemistry was ranked 401-450 th in the world

 QS World University Rankings by Subject 2018 
 Life Sciences & Medicine - Biological Sciences was ranked 401-450 th in the world
 Natural Sciences - Chemistry was ranked 451-500 th in the world

 QS World University Rankings by Subject 2017
 Life Sciences & Medicine - Biological Sciences was ranked 401-450 th in the world
 Natural Sciences - Chemistry was ranked 451-500 th in the world

 QS World University Rankings by Subject 2016 
 Engineering & Technology - Computer Science & Information Systems was ranked 401-450 th in the world

 QS World University Rankings by Subject 2015 
 Life Sciences & Medicine - Biological Sciences was ranked 301-400 th in the world

In the 2020 U.S. News & World Report Ranking, Kasetsart University was ranked 747th in the field of Chemistry.

In the 2021 Times Higher Education World University Rankings, Kasetsart University was ranked 601-800th in Life Sciences, 601-800th in the field of Computer Science, and 1001+ in Physical Sciences.

Discoveries

Natural Sciences 
Viola umphangensis S. Nansai, Srisanga & Suwanph. : a new species from Thailand.
Cnemaspis lineatubercularis Ampai, Wood, Stuart & Aowphol: a new species from Thailand.
Pseudorhabdosynochus kasetsartensis Saengpheng & Purivirojkul: a new species from Thailand.
Stylogomphus thongphaphumensis Chainthong, Sartori & Boonsoong: a new species from Thailand.
 Thunbergia impatienoides Suwanph. & S. Vajrodaya: a new species from Thailand.
 Coelogyne phuhinrongklaensis Ngerns. & P. Tippayasri (Orchidaceae): a new species from Thailand.
 Piper viridescens sp. nov. (Piperaceae): a new species from Thailand. 
 Peperomia (Piperaceae), namely P. heptaphylla, P. masuthoniana, P. multisurcula and P. sirindhorniana: four new species from Thailand.
 Sangpradubina: a new genus from Thailand.
 Compsoneuriella braaschi Boonsoong & Sartori, 2015: a new species from Thailand. 
 Gilliesia ratchaburiensis Boonsoong & Sartori, 2015: a new species from Thailand.
 Cymbalcloeon sartorii Suttinun, Gattolliat & Boonsoong, 2020: a new species from Thailand.
Placobdelloides sirikanchanae sp. nov., a new species of glossiphoniid leech and a parasite of turtles from lower southern Thailand (Hirudinea, Rhynchobdellida)
Batracobdelloides bangkhenensis sp. n. (Hirudinea: Rhynchobdellida), a new leech species parasite on freshwater snails from Thailand
Procerobaetis totuspinosus sp. nov., a new species from Thailand
 Placobdelloides tridens sp. n., a new species of glossiphoniid leech (Hirudinea: Rhynchobdellida) from Thailand

Notable alumni 
Throughout its history, a sizeable number of KU Science Alumni, have become notable in many varied fields, both academic and otherwise. Alumni who are prominent in work include Princess Chulabhorn a Thai princess who was awarded the UNESCO Albert Einstein medal for her efforts in promoting scientific collaboration in 1986 'KU35, Lieutenant General Poonpirom Liptapanlop former Minister of Energy of Thailand 'KU33, Ms. Jirawan Boonperm former Permanent Secretary, Ministry of Information and Communication Technology of Thailand 'KU30, Mr. Somchai Tiamboonprasert former Deputy Permanent Secretary, Ministry of Science and Technology of Thailand, Ms. Pannee Sriyuthasak former Deputy Permanent Secretary, Ministry of Labour of Thailand and former Director General of Department of Skill Development of Thailand 'KU33, and Ms. Kongkanda Chayamarit a Thai Botanist and former Director General of The Botanical Garden Organization, Thailand 'KU31.

References

External links 

 Faculty of Science, Kasetsart University
 Science Alumni Association of Kasetsart University
 พระราชกฤษฎีกาจัดแบ่งคณะในมหาวิทยาลัยเกษตรศาสตร์ พุทธศักราช ๒๔๘๖ 
 พระราชกฤษฎีกาจัดแบ่งคณะในมหาวิทยาลัยเกษตรศาสตร์ พุทธศักราช ๒๕๐๙ 
 ประกาศทบวงมหาวิทยาลัย เรื่อง การแบ่งส่วนราชการในมหาวิทยาลัยเกษตรศาสตร์ พ.ศ. ๒๕๒๔ ปรับปรุงการแบ่งส่วนราชการของคณะวิทยาศาสตร์และอักษรศาสตร์
 พระราชกฤษฎีกากำหนดหลักสูตรปริญญาตรีในมหาวิทยาลัยเกษตรศาสตร์ พุทธศักราช ๒๔๘๙ 
 พระราชบัญญัติมหาวิทยาลัยเกษตรศาสตร์ พุทธศักราช ๒๔๘๖ 

Kasetsart University
1966 establishments in Thailand
Chatuchak district
Educational institutions established in 1966
Science education in Thailand
University departments in Thailand